The 2002 Team Ice Racing World Championship was the 24th edition of the Team World Championship. The final was held on ?, 2002, in Krasnogorsk, in Russia. Sweden won their third title and a European team finished in the bronze medal position.

Final Classification

See also 
 2002 Individual Ice Speedway World Championship
 2002 Speedway World Cup in classic speedway
 2002 Speedway Grand Prix in classic speedway

References 

Ice speedway competitions
World